Infantile systemic hyalinosis  is an allelic autosomal-recessive condition characterized by multiple skin nodules, hyaline deposition, gingival hypertrophy, osteolytic bone lesions and joint contractures.

Genetics

This disease is caused by mutations in the CMG2 gene (ANTXR2).

Diagnosis

Management

See also
 Skin lesion
 List of cutaneous conditions

References

External links 
 GeneReview/NIH/UW entry on Hyalinosis, Inherited Systemic

Dermal and subcutaneous growths
Congenital disorders of musculoskeletal system
Autosomal recessive disorders